The men's long jump event at the 2007 European Athletics U23 Championships was held in Debrecen, Hungary, at Gyulai István Atlétikai Stadion on 12 and 13 July.

Medalists

Results

Final
13 July

Qualifications
12 July
Qualifying perf. 7.65 or 12 best to the Final

Participation
According to an unofficial count, 20 athletes from 15 countries participated in the event.

 (1)
 (1)
 (2)
 (1)
 (1)
 (1)
 (1)
 (2)
 (2)
 (1)
 (1)
 (1)
 (1)
 (2)
 (2)

References

Long jump
Long jump at the European Athletics U23 Championships